Ipur may refer to:

Ipur, Guntur district, a village in Guntur district, Andhra Pradesh, India
Ipurupalem, a village in Prakasam district, Andhra Pradesh, India
Epuru, West Godavari district, a village in West Godavari district, Andhra Pradesh, India